The 1986 Tournament Players Championship was a golf tournament in Florida on the PGA Tour, held  at TPC Sawgrass in Ponte Vedra Beach, southeast of Jacksonville. It was the thirteenth Tournament Players Championship. 

John Mahaffey shot 71 in the final round for 275 (−13) and the win, one stroke ahead of runner-up Larry Mize, the 54-hole leader.

Calvin Peete missed the 36-hole cut by two strokes, the first time a participating defending champion did not play the weekend.

Venue

Eligibility requirements 
1. Top 125 players, if PGA Tour members, from final 1985 Official Money List:

Curtis Strange, Lanny Wadkins, Calvin Peete, Jim Thorpe, Raymond Floyd, Corey Pavin, Hal Sutton, Roger Maltbie, John Mahaffey, Mark O'Meara, Craig Stadler, Joey Sindelar, Bernhard Langer, Tom Kite, Fuzzy Zoeller, Hubert Green, Larry Mize, Tom Watson, Payne Stewart, Mac O'Grady, George Burns, Wayne Levi, Peter Jacobsen, Andy North, Danny Edwards, Dan Pohl, Phil Blackmar, Bill Glasson, Larry Rinker, Hale Irwin, Mark McCumber, Andy Bean, Jodie Mudd, Scott Hoch, Mark Wiebe, Billy Kratzert, Fred Couples, Scott Simpson, Mike Reid, Wayne Grady, Greg Norman, Jack Nicklaus, Tim Simpson, Bob Tway, Don Pooley,  Willie Wood, D. A. Weibring, Bob Eastwood, Ken Green, Dan Forsman, Larry Nelson, Ron Streck, Lee Trevino, Woody Blackburn, Doug Tewell, Bruce Lietzke, Keith Fergus, Brett Upper, Gil Morgan, Clarence Rose, Johnny Miller, Dave Barr, Tony Sills, Buddy Gardner, Gary Koch, Jay Haas, David Frost, Ed Fiori, Mark Lye, Dan Halldorson, George Archer, Gary Hallberg, Lon Hinkle, Donnie Hammond, Jeff Sluman, Bob Murphy, Nick Price, Bob Lohr, Howard Twitty, Loren Roberts, Isao Aoki, Mike Donald, Steve Pate, Russ Cochran, Jim Colbert, Pat McGowan, Bobby Wadkins, Tim Norris, Barry Jaeckel, Paul Azinger, Bobby Clampett, David Ogrin, Morris Hatalsky, Chip Beck, TC Chen, Andrew Magee, Brad Fabel, David Graham, Richard Zokol, Frank Conner, J. C. Snead, Jim Simons, John Cook, Joe Inman, Mark Hayes, Ronnie Black, Chris Perry, Kikuo Arai, Ken Brown, Rex Caldwell, Bill Sander, Mark Pfeil, Nick Faldo, Pat Lindsey, Tom Purtzer, Lennie Clements, Gene Sauers, Leonard Thompson, Bob Gilder, Brad Faxon, Jay Delsing 

 Jim Nelford, Jack Renner, Mike Smith, and Denis Watson elected not to play

Source:

2. Designated players

Ben Crenshaw, Scott Verplank

3. Any foreign player meeting the requirements of a designated player whether or not he is a PGA Tour member

Sandy Lyle

4. Winners in the last 10 calendar years of the Tournament Players Championship, PGA Championship, U.S. Open, Masters Tournament and World Series of Golf

Dave Stockton

5. The leader in Senior PGA Tour official earnings of 1985

 Peter Thomson elected not to play

Source:

6. The three players, not otherwise eligible, designated by the TPC Committee as "special selections"

Dick Mast, Tsuneyuki Nakajima, Arnold Palmer

7. To complete a field of 144 players. those players in order, not otherwise eligible, from the 1986 Official Money List as of the completion of the Hertz Bay Hill Classic on March 16, 1986

Kenny Knox, Jim Gallagher Jr., Mike Hulbert, Antonio Cerda Jr., Andy Dillard, Mike Sullivan, Bill Israelson, David Edwards, Dave Rummells, John Adams, Dennis Trixler, Davis Love III, Tom Sieckmann, Greg Ladehoff, Charlie Bolling, Bill Rogers

Source:

General Source:

Round summaries

First round
Thursday, March 27, 1986

Source:

Second round
Friday, March 28, 1986

Source:

Third round
Saturday, March 29, 1986

Source:

Final round
Sunday, March 30, 1986

References

External links
The Players Championship website

1986
1986 in golf
1986 in American sports
1986 in sports in Florida
March 1986 sports events in the United States